Skhodnya River, also known as Sukhodnya, Vkhodnya, Vykhodnya and Vskhodnya is a river in the northwest of Moscow, Russia, the second largest tributary (after the Yauza) of the Moskva. The Skhodnya originates near the village of Alabushevo (part of Zelenograd) and flows into the Moskva River near the Tushino Airfield. The Skhodnya is connected with a derivational canal, which supplies water from the Volga through the Khimki Reservoir (with the help of the Skhodnenskaya hydroelectric plant) to Moscow for sanitary irrigation.

Gallery

References

Rivers of Moscow Oblast
Rivers of Moscow